Kappeler is a surname. Notable people with the surname include:

Andreas Kappeler (born 1943), Swiss historian
Karl Kappeler (1816–1888), Swiss politician
Marcel Kappeler (1881–?), French wrestler 
Susanne Kappeler (born 1949), British academic

See also
Kappelen